Trolley Station or Trolley station may refer to:

a tram stop, a designated stopping point for a tram, streetcar, or light rail vehicle so that passengers can board or alight

Audubon Trolley Station, a historic trolley shelter listed on the National Register of Historic Places, in Wilmington, North Carolina
Oakton Trolley Station, a historic interurban station listed on the National Register of Historic Places, in Fairfax County, Virginia
Trolley station (UTA), a light rail station in the Central City neighborhood of Salt Lake City, Utah, at 625 East 400 South
Williamsburg Bridge Trolley Terminal, an underground streetcar terminal in the Lower East Side of Manhattan, New York City, also called the Essex Street Trolley Terminal or Delancey Street Trolley Terminal
any of the San Diego Trolley light rail stations: List of San Diego Trolley stations